Benjamin Hart (born 9 July 1974) is a former professional Australian rules footballer who played for the Adelaide Football Club in the Australian Football League. He was an assistant coach with the Collingwood Football Club from 2012 to 2016.

Early career
Ben Hart made his debut in the SANFL for North Adelaide in a semi final in 1990 at 16 years of age, he went on to combine his college commitments with those of the North Adelaide Roosters until he was selected by the Crows in 1992.

In 1992, Hart made his debut in the Adelaide Crows side direct from the 1st XVIII Rostrevor College team, and made an immediate impact as a defender, playing all 22 games (and booting 3 goals). The then 18-year-old Hart won All-Australian selection that year and repeated that feat in 1993.

Records
In early 2005, Hart passed the Adelaide games record, overtaking Nigel Smart with 279 games. In early 2006 Hart reached another milestone, by becoming the first Adelaide Crows player to join the exclusive 300 games club. Hart had been in superb form early in 2006 but suffered his first major injury, a broken arm vs Richmond in Round 8 of 2006, making his return in Round 16. He was again injured in Round 21, ending his season and his career.

Retirement
At the end of the 2006 season, Hart was delisted by the Crows due to the long-term injuries of Biglands and Hentschel and concerns over Hart's age and durability.
On 18 November 2006 Hart nominated for the national draft but was overlooked by all clubs.

He played for North Adelaide in the SANFL in 2007, helping them reach a grand final in 2007, and after this he announced his retirement.

From 2008 to 2011, Hart was an assistant coach for the Adelaide Crows. He was then an assistant coach for the Collingwood Magpies from 2012 to 2016. In 2018, Hart returned to the Adelaide Crows, resuming his role as assistant coach. He later left in 2020 and returned to Melbourne.

Statistics

|-
|- style="background-color: #EAEAEA"
! scope="row" style="text-align:center" | 1992
|style="text-align:center;"|
| 34 || 22 || 4 || 2 || 169 || 91 || 260 || 54 || 20 || 0.2 || 0.1 || 7.7 || 4.1 || 11.8 || 2.5 || 0.9
|-
! scope="row" style="text-align:center" | 1993
|style="text-align:center;"|
| 34 || 20 || 2 || 1 || 134 || 67 || 201 || 35 || 31 || 0.1 || 0.1 || 6.7 || 3.4 || 10.1 || 1.8 || 1.6
|- style="background-color: #EAEAEA"
! scope="row" style="text-align:center" | 1994
|style="text-align:center;"|
| 34 || 22 || 4 || 4 || 255 || 97 || 352 || 78 || 36 || 0.2 || 0.2 || 11.6 || 4.4 || 16.0 || 3.5 || 1.6
|-
! scope="row" style="text-align:center" | 1995
|style="text-align:center;"|
| 34 || 21 || 10 || 7 || 222 || 74 || 296 || 60 || 37 || 0.5 || 0.3 || 10.6 || 3.5 || 14.1 || 2.9 || 1.8
|- style="background-color: #EAEAEA"
! scope="row" style="text-align:center" | 1996
|style="text-align:center;"|
| 34 || 22 || 4 || 4 || 190 || 112 || 302 || 57 || 24 || 0.2 || 0.2 || 8.6 || 5.1 || 13.7 || 2.6 || 1.1
|-
! scope="row" style="text-align:center;" | 1997
|style="text-align:center;"|
| 34 || 26 || 2 || 6 || 287 || 80 || 367 || 102 || 31 || 0.1 || 0.2 || 11.0 || 3.1 || 14.1 || 3.9 || 1.2
|- style="background-color: #EAEAEA"
! scope="row" style="text-align:center;" | 1998
|style="text-align:center;"|
| 34 || 26 || 5 || 3 || 213 || 76 || 289 || 76 || 61 || 0.2 || 0.1 || 8.2 || 2.9 || 11.1 || 2.9 || 2.3
|-
! scope="row" style="text-align:center" | 1999
|style="text-align:center;"|
| 34 || 21 || 3 || 2 || 229 || 81 || 310 || 90 || 21 || 0.1 || 0.1 || 10.9 || 3.9 || 14.8 || 4.3 || 1.0
|- style="background-color: #EAEAEA"
! scope="row" style="text-align:center" | 2000
|style="text-align:center;"|
| 34 || 22 || 2 || 2 || 209 || 68 || 277 || 79 || 33 || 0.1 || 0.1 || 9.5 || 3.1 || 12.6 || 3.6 || 1.5
|-
! scope="row" style="text-align:center" | 2001
|style="text-align:center;"|
| 34 || 22 || 4 || 4 || 256 || 72 || 328 || 78 || 46 || 0.2 || 0.2 || 11.6 || 3.3 || 14.9 || 3.5 || 2.1
|- style="background-color: #EAEAEA"
! scope="row" style="text-align:center" | 2002
|style="text-align:center;"|
| 34 || 25 || 2 || 2 || 302 || 97 || 399 || 110 || 43 || 0.1 || 0.1 || 12.1 || 3.9 || 16.0 || 4.4 || 1.7
|-
! scope="row" style="text-align:center" | 2003
|style="text-align:center;"|
| 34 || 21 || 0 || 2 || 217 || 80 || 297 || 73 || 46 || 0.0 || 0.1 || 10.3 || 3.8 || 14.1 || 3.5 || 2.2
|- style="background-color: #EAEAEA"
! scope="row" style="text-align:center" | 2004
|style="text-align:center;"|
| 34 || 6 || 0 || 0 || 57 || 21 || 78 || 29 || 6 || 0.0 || 0.0 || 9.5 || 3.5 || 13.0 || 4.8 || 1.0
|-
! scope="row" style="text-align:center" | 2005
|style="text-align:center;"|
| 34 || 22 || 3 || 1 || 215 || 111 || 326 || 85 || 35 || 0.1 || 0.0 || 9.8 || 5.0 || 14.8 || 3.9 || 1.6
|- style="background-color: #EAEAEA"
! scope="row" style="text-align:center" | 2006
|style="text-align:center;"|
| 34 || 13 || 0 || 0 || 131 || 59 || 190 || 76 || 12 || 0.0 || 0.0 || 10.1 || 4.5 || 14.6 || 5.8 || 0.9
|- class="sortbottom"
! colspan=3| Career
! 311
! 45
! 40
! 3086
! 1186
! 4272
! 1082
! 482
! 0.1
! 0.1
! 9.9
! 3.8
! 13.7
! 3.5
! 1.5
|}

References

External links

North Adelaide Football Club players
1974 births
Living people
Adelaide Football Club players
Adelaide Football Club Premiership players
All-Australians (AFL)
Malcolm Blight Medal winners
South Australian State of Origin players
Australian rules footballers from South Australia
South Australian Football Hall of Fame inductees
Australian Football Hall of Fame inductees
Australia international rules football team players
Two-time VFL/AFL Premiership players